Taeniopyga is a genus of moths of the family Noctuidae.  It is considered a synonym of genus Diaphone.

References
Natural History Museum Lepidoptera genus database

Glottulinae